Ismi Khan Jami Mosque is a ruined mosque of the 17–18th centuries in Bakhchysarai, Crimea. The decor felt European influences (the Baroque or classicism). It was built by an unknown Khan of the Crimean Khanate.

See also
Religion in Crimea
List of mosques in Europe

Mosques in Bakhchysarai
Cultural heritage monuments of regional significance in Crimea